Applied Acoustics (French: Acoustique Appliquée, German: Angewandte Akustik) is a bimonthly peer-reviewed scientific journal. It was established in 1968 Elsevier, who continues to publish the journal bimonthly. This journal covers research and applications in all aspects of acoustics. The editor in chief is Shiu Keung Tang and Kai Ming Li.

According to the Journal Citation Reports, the journal has a 2021 impact factor of 3.614.

Abstracting and indexing
This journal is indexed by the following services:

Science Citation Index
Current Contents/ Engineering, Computing & Technology
Academic Onefile
Applied Mechanics Reviews
CSA (database company)
Ei Compendex
EBSCO Information Services
GeoRef
INSPEC
Scopus

External links
 Journal Homepage

References

Bimonthly journals
Acoustics journals
Elsevier academic journals
Engineering journals